Norbert Casper Lynton  (22 September 1927 – 30 October 2007, Brighton, England ) was Professor of the History of Art at the University of Sussex.   From 1998 - 2006 he was Chairman of the Charleston Trust.

He has published on architecture and on modern artists including Paul Klee, Ben Nicholson, William Scott. With Erika Langmuir, he coauthored the 'Yale Dictionary of Modern Art'. Among his significant works are 'The Story of Modern Art' published by Phaidon Press Ltd and the introduction for the book that accompanied the major international exhibition  'Painting the Century: 101 Portrait Masterpieces 1900–2000' held at the National Portrait Gallery in London to celebrate the millennium.

Lynton finished a book about the Russian painter and architect Vladimir Tatlin shortly before his death. A further publication on the work of Bernard Cohen appeared posthumously in 2009. He left four sons, Jeremy, Oliver, Thomas and Peter.

Notes and references

External links
   Publications by Norbert Lynton in the National Art Library
Obituary in The Guardian, 3 November 2007
Obituary in The Times, 6 November 2007
Obituary in The Independent, 7 November 2007
Obituary in The Telegraph, 13 November 2007 – includes photo

1927 births
2007 deaths
People educated at Douai School
British art historians
Academics of the University of Sussex
Officers of the Order of the British Empire